The 1996 Swedish Open was a men's tennis tournament played on outdoor clay courts in Båstad in Sweden and was part of the World Series of the 1996 ATP Tour. It was the 49th edition of the tournament and was held from 8 July until 14 July 1996. Fourth-seeded Magnus Gustafsson won the singles title.

Finals

Singles

 Magnus Gustafsson defeated  Andriy Medvedev 6–1, 6–3
 It was Gustafsson's 2nd singles title of the year and the 9th of his career.

Doubles

 David Ekerot /  Jeff Tarango defeated  Joshua Eagle /  Peter Nyborg 6–4, 6–1
 It was Ekerot's 1st title of the year and the 1st of his career. It was Tarango's 1st title of the year and the 6th of his career.

References

External links
 Official website 
 ATP tournament profile
 ITF tournament edition details

Swedish Open
Swedish Open
Swedish Open
Swedish Open
Swed